The Iowa Girls High School Athletic Union (IGHSAU) is the governing body for girls' junior and senior high school sports in the U.S. state of Iowa. The association promotes and regulates interscholastic sports among its member schools. Though its counterpart for boys sports in Iowa, the Iowa High School Athletic Association, is a full-time member of the National Federation of State High School Associations, the IGHSAU is only an affiliate member. It is headquartered at 5000 Westown Parkway, Suite 150,West Des Moines, Iowa 50266.

Sports currently overseen by the IGHSAU are basketball, bowling, cross country, golf, soccer, softball, swimming & diving, track and field, tennis, and volleyball.

Sports previously overseen by the IGHSAU were gymnastics, synchronized swimming, and indoor track and field.

Basketball

Classification guidelines
5A- Largest 40 schools by enrollment 
4A- Next Largest 48
3A- Next Largest 64
2A- Next Largest 80
1A- Remaining schools

State Champions
From 1920 until 1984, there was one tournament for teams with 6 players.

From 1985-1993, there was a tournament for 5-player teams and one for 6-player teams.

From 1994-2012, there were 4 classes, all with 5 players

From 2013–present, there are 5 classes, all with 5 players

Bowling

Classification guidelines
3A- Largest 30 schools by enrollment 
2A- Next Largest 30
1A- Remaining schools

State Champions
From 2007-2014, 2 Classes

From 2015–present, 3 classes:

Soccer

Classification guidelines
3A- Largest 40 schools by enrollment 
2A- Next Largest 48
1A- Remaining schools

State Champions
From 1998–2001, one class:

From 2002–2010, 2 classes:

From 2011–present, 3 classes:

Softball

Classification guidelines
5A- Largest 40 schools by enrollment 
4A- Next Largest 48
3A- Next Largest 64
2A- Next Largest 80
1A- Remaining schools

State Champions
From 1957–1987, one class, summer and fall seasons:

From 1988–1993, one class:

From 1994–2003, 3 classes:

From 2004–2011, 4 classes:

From 2012–present, 5 classes:

Tennis

Classification guidelines
2A - Largest 48 schools by enrollment 
1A - Remaining schools

State Champions

Track and Field

Classification guidelines
4A- Largest 48 schools by enrollment 
3A- Next Largest 64
2A- Next Largest 96
1A- Remaining schools

State Champions

From 1962 to 1976: one class

From 1977 to 2003: 3 classes

From 2004 to current: 4 classes

Volleyball

Classification guidelines
5A- Largest 40 schools by enrollment 
4A- Next Largest 48
3A- Next Largest 64
2A- Next Largest 80
1A- Remaining schools

State Champions
From 1970–1973, one class, winter season play only:

From 1973–1980, one class:

From 1981–1993, 2 classes:

From 1994–2002, 3 classes:

From 2003–2011, 4 classes:

From 2012–present, 5 classes

Defunct sports
Three sports were previously overseen by the IGHSAU. These three sports were: gymnastics, synchronized swimming, and indoor track and field.

Gymnastics

Classification guidelines
Gymnastics was an IGHSAU sponsored sport from 1968–1988.

State Champions
From 1968–1988, one class:

Synchronized Swimming

Classification guidelines
Synchronized Swimming was an IGHSAU sponsored sport from 1970–1981.

State Champions
From 1970–1981, one class:

Indoor Track & Field

Classification guidelines
Indoor Track & Field was an IGHSAU sponsored sport from 1965–1997.

State Champions
From 1965–1997, one class:

IGHSAU Executive Directors

References

External links
 Official website

High school sports associations in the United States

Sports organizations established in 1927
High school sports in Iowa
Women's sports in Iowa